Unworthy may refer to:

Music 
 Unworthy, a 1976 album by The Clark Sisters
 "Unworthy", a 1992 single by Thieves
 Unworthy, a 1993 album by David McAlmont, formerly of Thieves
 Unworthy, a 2013 EP by Convictions
 "Unworthy", a song by Commissioned from the 2006 album Praise & Worship 
 "Unworthy", a song by DJ Casper from the 2000 album Cha Cha Slide
 "Unworthy", a song by Godflesh from the 2004 EP Merciless 
 "Unworthy", a 2017 single by Vancouver Sleep Clinic

Other uses 
 Nalayak ('Unworthy'), a 1978 Bollywood film

See also 

 Worthless (disambiguation)
 Worthy (disambiguation)
 Humility, the quality of being humble
 Life unworthy of life, a Nazi designation for segments of the population
 Parable of the Master and Servant in the Bible, from which comes the liturgical phrase "unworthy servants"
 The Unworthy Thor, in the Marvel comics universe
 Unworthy Republic, a 2020 book by Claudio Saunt